Trevor Something is the alias of Clayton Bullard, an American musician known for creating synthwave music. He creates both original music as well as remixed music through the sampling and mixing of music by other artists.

Recording career 
Trevor Something's first single, 'All Night' was released on September 11, 2013. His first LP, titled Synthetic Love was released on January 28, 2014. It was followed up with his first mixtape, Trevor Something Does Not Exist and two EPs, Distorted Reality and Lost Memories later in 2014. His second and third LPs, Death Dream and Soulless Computer Boy and The Eternal Render debuted in 2015 and 2016 respectively. On May 19, 2017, his fourth LP, Die With You was released, featuring a 2005 illustration "The Last Embrace" by artist Laurie Lipton as its cover art. The third EP from Trevor Something, Lost Love was released on June 21, 2018. It was followed by his fifth LP, ULTRAPARANOIA on October 12, 2018. His sixth LP, titled Bots Don't Cry was released on February 15, 2019. On July 19, 2019, Trevor Something debuted his fourth and most recent EP, Escape. His seventh LP, microwaves was released on April 17, 2020. It was quickly followed up with his eighth LP, Deep Wave Data Dark Web Daemons on May 8, 2020. Trevor's ninth LP, Love Me and Leave Me debuted on June 4, 2021. His tenth and latest LP, The Death Of (Trevor Something) was released on March 25, 2022.

Discography 
Since 2013, Trevor Something has debuted 15 albums under his own stage name. He has also performed additional work under different stage names through his record label 'In Your Brain LLC'.

On March 24th, 2022, Trevor Something made a social media post which claimed The Death Of would be his last album. The cryptic statement coincides with the creator's apparent intent to depart from his long-held anonymous persona, which is further corroborated within the album's theme, imagery, lyrics, and the use of his given name in the credits and merchandise. Trevor has since produced additional music for three new releases, beginning with My Soul Burns As My Consciousness Is Uploaded Into The Virtual Afterlife on July 1st, followed by Bury Me In My Loneliness on September 22nd. Then on December 19th, he released Flying with the Angels

Trevor Something 
Fifteen albums.

LPs
 Synthetic Love (2014)
 Death Dream (2015)
 Soulless Computer Boy and The Eternal Render (2016)
 Die With You (2017)
 ULTRAPARANOIA (2018)
 Bots Don't Cry (2019)
 microwaves (2020)
 Deep Wave Data Dark Web Daemons (2020)
 Love Me and Leave Me (2021)
 The Death Of (2022)

EPs
 Distorted Reality (2014)
 Lost Memories (2014)
 Lost Love (2018)
 Escape (2019)
 Flying With the Angels (2022)
 Letting out My Demons (2023)

Mixtape
 Trevor Something Does Not Exist (2014)

Others

Clay Bullet 
One album.
 Music for the Deaf / Dreaming Under the Influence (2013)

Cashous Clay 
Two albums.
 Uncleared Instrumentals 2 (2013)
 Uncleared Instrumentals 3 (2014)

Paranoid Pavement 
One album.
 何故 H O W L O N G I S F O R E V E R 万年 (2014)

In Your Brain LLC 
Two albums.
 トレバー何か - T E C H N O P H O B I A テクノフォビア (2015)
 Cry Baby (2019)

Hibachi Kid 
Three albums.
 Enter the Sushi (2015)
 Dream Forever (2017)
 Radiation Mutation (2020)

 Staring at Screens 
Three albums.
 Staring at Screens (2016)
 Fantasy Hotline (2017)
 Room (2020)

 sweat shop lsd 
One album.
 Dead Soul Collage'' (2016)

References

External links 
 Trevor Something official website
 Official Tumblr page
 Trevor Something Discogs Page

American electronic musicians
Musicians from Florida